The Formula Crane 45 was a single-seater racing series held at Autopolis in 1991 and 1992.

History
Owner of the Autopolis circuit Tomonori Tsurumaki ordered 30 Buick powered US built single seater race cars called Sabre FC45 for a race to take place on his circuit's grand opening on November 1990, consisting of a mixture of invited US CART drivers such as Stan Fox, Johnny Rutherford, Dick Simon, Gary and Tony Bettenhausen against local Japanese drivers. The cars were originally built for a spec racing class to have been run by USAC; however, this class was never realized. After the grand opening, Tsurumaki planned on a series with the cars, known as Formula Crane 45. With only a handful of cars during the 1991 and 1992 season the class was not very successful. When Autopolis went bankrupt the assets including the cars were sold to the highest bidder.

1991

1992

Champions

References

Auto racing series in Japan
Formula racing
Formula racing series
Recurring sporting events established in 1991
Recurring events disestablished in 1992
Defunct auto racing series